Jalan Kamunting Lama or Old Kamunting Road (route 3146; previously route A2) is a federal road in Perak, Malaysia.

List of junctions

Kamunting Lama